Margit Gennser (born 15 November 1931) is a Swedish Moderate Party politician and economist.

Siv Margit Gennser was born in Helsingborg to Carl Lööb and Gertrud Augustin, and married Gerhard Gennser in 1954. She graduated as economist from the Stockholm School of Economics in 1955. She served as a member of the Riksdag from 1982 to 2002.

Her books include Kostnads och intäktsanalysens ABC from 1965; further four books in cooperation with Lars O. Andersson, Företagets ekonomi (1967), Redovisa och bokföra (1968), Vägar för distribution (1969), and Frågor om skatt (1970); Arbetslivsorientering (part 1, 1973, and part 2, 1975, jointly with Lennart Sahlsten), Löntagaraktier eller fackföreningsfonder? (1976), and Kommunen betalar (1982).

References

1931 births
Living people
People from Helsingborg
Members of the Riksdag from the Moderate Party
Women members of the Riksdag
Members of the Riksdag 1994–1998
Members of the Riksdag 1998–2002
21st-century Swedish women politicians